Drimiopsis is a village in the Omaheke Region in Namibia, about 40 km north of Gobabis. The local population includes mainly San, Khoekhoe-speakers, Herero, and Tswana.

The town features two schools,  Drimiopsis Primary School and Mokganedi Tlhabanello High School, serving 489 and 590 pupils respectively in 2008. In 2012, the high school had 453 students.

Drimiopsis lies on the C22 regional road which runs from Aranos through Gobabis south to Otjiwarongo, where it ends at the intersection with the B1 road.

References

External links 
 (en) Spain contributes to food security in Drimiopsis resettlement, Republikein, October 24, 2014. URL accessed 3 February 2016.
 (af) (en) Foto's van plaasgrafte by Drimiopsis (Pictures of farm graves in Drimiopsis). URL accessed 3 February 2016.
 Drimiopsis schools without power, water, The Namibian, September 30, 2008. URL accessed on 3 February 2016.

Populated places in the Omaheke Region